"The Ticket" is the 44th episode of the sitcom Seinfeld. It is the 4th episode of the fourth season. It aired on September 16, 1992 as a one-hour episode with "The Pitch". In this episode, Jerry and George meet with NBC executives to discuss their proposal for a pilot, while Kramer behaves oddly due to a severe blow to the head.

Plot
Continuing from "The Pitch," as a result of a blow on the head by Crazy Joe Davola, Kramer starts suffering from hemispatial neglect and possibly a concussion: he forgets to dress/shave half of his body properly, randomly says "Yo-Yo Ma," and starts spouting gibberish while talking on the phone. NBC gives Jerry and George another meeting about their idea for a pilot. On the way, Jerry complains that his watch, gifted to him by his parents, doesn't keep time properly and is too slow. Jerry throws the watch in a trash can on the sidewalk. He then runs into his Uncle Leo, who subsequently discovers the watch sitting in the trash. Leo picks the watch out of the garbage and pockets it. Kramer agrees to be an alibi for Newman's trial on a speeding ticket: Newman was simply racing home to stop Kramer, despondent over never becoming a banker, from committing suicide. Once in court, however, Kramer experiences short-term memory loss due to his head injury and completely forgets about their agreed-to alibi, causing Newman's case to crumble.

George and Jerry meet with NBC executives and they give the go-ahead for a pilot. Afterwards, Jerry and George go to the coffee shop, where Jerry calls his manager to find out that NBC has offered them $13,000 for the pilot. George thinks this offer is insultingly low, comparing it to what he believes NBC pays Ted Danson. George then glances out the window and thinks he sees Crazy Joe Davola outside, making Jerry and George afraid to leave the cafe. Jerry attempts to enlist the help of a policeman to walk him and George to a taxi cab; however, the policeman orders a sandwich and refuses to escort them out until he has eaten. 
Meanwhile, Elaine is in Europe with her psychiatrist, who realizes that he did not leave an extra prescription for Joe for the time while he would be on vacation, explaining Joe's imbalanced behavior.

References

External links

Seinfeld (season 4) episodes
1992 American television episodes
Television episodes written by Larry David